Stanisław Burzyński (born 1943) is a purveyor of unproven cancer treatments and founder of the Burzynski Clinic in Houston, Texas.

Stanisław Burzyński or Stanislaw Burzynski may also refer to:

 Stanisław Burzyński (footballer) (1948–1991), Polish footballer